Charles H. Joffe (July 16, 1929 – July 9, 2008) was an American film producer and comedy talent manager. He is best known as, in partnership with Jack Rollins, the producer or executive producer of most of Woody Allen's films. Joffe won the 1977 Academy Award for Best Picture as producer of Allen's Annie Hall.

Annie Hall was listed as "A Jack Rollins and Charles H. Joffe Production", though only Joffe took producer credit and received the Academy Award for Best Picture. Both were Allen's longtime managers and had that credit on all his films from 1969 to 1993. Joffe focused more on Allen, with Rollins focusing on others. Their clients also included Robert Klein and David Letterman.

Biography
Joffe was born in Brooklyn, New York, the son of Esther (Gordon) and Sid Joffe, a pharmacist. He worked as a booking agent for bands at local nightclubs while studying journalism at Syracuse University. He then worked under Rollins as a junior agent at Music Corporation of America. In 1953, he and Rollins left MCA and formed their own agency in Manhattan.

Personal life
Joffe was married to set decorator Carol Joffe (former wife of sculptor Lawrence Holofcener) with whom he has an adopted son, Cory Joffe, and two stepdaughters, Suzanne Holofcener and director Nicole Holofcener. He died at Cedars-Sinai Medical Center in Los Angeles, a week before his 79th birthday, after a long illness.

Filmography

Producer

Awards and nominations

References

External links

1929 births
2008 deaths
American film producers
Filmmakers who won the Best Film BAFTA Award
Producers who won the Best Picture Academy Award